Martinelli's is the brand name of S. Martinelli & Company, a non-alcoholic cider and juice company founded in 1868, and is located in Watsonville, California. The company is privately held by descendants of the founders. It is best known for its non-alcoholic sparkling apple cider and its apple juice.

History 
Stepheno Martinelli emigrated in the late 1850s from Switzerland to California, and he moved into his brother Luigi’s farm in Watsonville. Stepheno initially was in the soda business and realized he could make money by creating hard ciders from the apples grown on his brother's farm. The company was founded in 1868 in the Pajaro Valley by the two Martinelli brothers.

Stepheno previously had experience making champagne in France. The recipe won a gold medal at the 1890 California State Fair. As of 2021, it is a fifth-generation family operated business. 

Martinelli's has also produced a sparkling hard cider. They also have several other brands of juices. There is a street in Watsonville that bears the Martinelli name.

References

External links 
 

Companies based in Santa Cruz County, California
Watsonville, California
Juice brands
American ciders
Swiss-American culture
Drink companies based in California
American companies established in 1868
Food and drink companies established in 1868
1868 establishments in California